Three Go Back is a novel by J. Leslie Mitchell published in 1932.

Plot summary
Three Go Back is a novel in which an airship goes back 25,000 years and encounters Cro-Magnons and Neanderthals.

Reception
Dave Langford reviewed Three Go Back for White Dwarf #79, and stated that "it's a pleasant novel, and reminds you that while American magazine heroes were zapping greenskins with their blasters, some 1930s authors still considered SF a literature of ideas."

Reviews
Review by C. A. Brandt (1932) in Amazing Stories, August 1932
Review by Bill Collins (1986) in Fantasy Review, July-August 1986
Review by Chris Morgan (1986) in Fantasy Review, July-August 1986
Review by Edward James (1986) in Vector 134
Review by Don D'Ammassa (1987) in Science Fiction Chronicle, #91 April 1987

References

1932 British novels
Fiction about neanderthals
Novels about time travel
Novels set in prehistory